Ruditapes is a genus of marine bivalve molluscs, in the family Veneridae.

Species 
 Ruditapes aureus
 Ruditapes bruguieri
 Ruditapes decussata
 Ruditapes decussatus 
 Ruditapes japonica 
 Ruditapes largillierti 
 Ruditapes philippinarum – Japanese littleneck
 Ruditapes semidecussata
 Ruditapes variegata 
 Ruditapes variegatus

References 
 ZipCodeZoo

Veneridae
Bivalve genera